Captain Clifford Charles Alan Lawrence Erskine-Bolst (1878 – 11 January 1946) was a British Conservative Party politician.

During the First World War, he served as a lieutenant in the 1st Black Watch Regiment, and as a captain in the 3rd Royal Highlanders.

He was elected as Member of Parliament (MP) for Hackney South at a by-election in August 1922 following the expulsion of the independent MP Horatio Bottomley, who had been convicted of fraud. He held the seat at the November 1922 general election, but lost it the following year at the 1923 general election.

Erskine-Bolt returned to the House of Commons at the November 1931 general election, when he was elected in the Blackpool constituency, defeating the writer Edgar Wallace, who ran as an independent Liberal.  He served only one term, stepping down at the  1935 general election.

He was married to California socialite Blanche Ryer from the early 1920s until their divorce in 1933.  As a result of this marriage he became the stepfather of Doris Ryer Nixon.

His name appears in the San Francisco Social Register for 1927, and again in 1932 (where he and his wife are listed as residents of Èze, France).

References

External links
maison dite villa Fantasia, puis villa Fal' Eze, puis villa Longemer (villa balnéaire) Describes a home in Èze, Côte d'Azur, Provence owned by Erskine-Bolst between 1926 and 1930.

External lists 
 

1878 births
1946 deaths
Conservative Party (UK) MPs for English constituencies
UK MPs 1922–1923
UK MPs 1931–1935
Hackney Members of Parliament